Diego de Paz Pazo (born 25 September 1971) is a Spanish wheelchair basketball player.

Wheelchair basketball 
De Paz is 4 point player.

National team 
He played wheelchair basketball at the 1996 Summer Paralympics. His selection to represent Spain at the 2011 European Championships was made in March. He was chosen for the 2012 team ahead of Jonatan Soria and José Luis Robles. He played wheelchair basketball at the 2012 Summer Paralympics.  His team was fifth.  They beat Germany 67–48 to finish fifth. It was the first time the Spain national team had qualified for the Paralympics in 16 years. In London, he was coached by Oscar Trigo. His team finished fifth overall. He played in the game against South Africa and Germany.  He scored 11 points in the game against the United States. In the Paralympics, he ranks 9th in history in the total number of three point shots made at the Games.  Following the conclusion of the London Games, he retired from international competition.  He cried openly on court following his last game.

Club 
In 2011, he played for Once Andalucía.

References

External links 
  (1992, 1996)
  (2012)
 

1971 births
Living people
Wheelchair category Paralympic competitors
Spanish men's wheelchair basketball players
Paralympic wheelchair basketball players of Spain
Wheelchair basketball players at the 1996 Summer Paralympics
Wheelchair basketball players at the 2012 Summer Paralympics
Sportspeople from Seville